Cungagnaq (date of birth unknown - d. 1815) is venerated as a martyr and saint (as Peter the Aleut) by some jurisdictions of the Eastern Orthodox Church.  He was a native of Kodiak Island (Alutiiq or Sugpiaq), and received the Christian name of Peter when he was baptized into the Orthodox faith by the monks of St Herman's missionaries operating in the north.  He was captured by Spanish soldiers near "San Pedro" and tortured and killed at the instigation of Roman Catholic priests either there or at a nearby location. At the time identified for his death, California was Spanish territory, and Spain was worried about Russian advances southwards from Alaska. Hubert Howe Bancroft, in his multi-volume History of California, only notes that, in connection with an incident wherein a Russian fur-hunting expedition was taken into custody after declining to leave San Pedro; one Russian source accused "the Spaniards of cruelty to the captives, stating that according to Kuskof’s report one Aleut who refused to become a Catholic died from ill-treatment received from the padre at San Francisco."

Martyrdom
According to the most fully developed version of the story, in 1815 a group of Russian employees of the Russian American Company and their Aleut seal and otter hunters, including Peter, was captured by Spanish soldiers, while hunting illicitly for seals near San Pedro, (which has variably been interpreted as either San Pedro, Los Angeles or as San Pedro y San Pablo Asistencia (in Pacifica, California).  According to the original account, the soldiers took them to "the mission in Saint-Pedro" for interrogation. One Russian source states that after being taken prisoner near modern Los Angeles, the captives were taken to Mission Dolores—that is, modern San Francisco. With threats of torture, the Roman Catholic priests attempted to force the Aleuts to deny their Orthodox faith and to convert to Roman Catholicism.

When the Aleuts refused, the priest had a toe severed from each of Peter's feet. Peter still refused to renounce his faith and the Spanish priest ordered a group of Native Americans, indigenous to California, to cut off each finger of Peter's hands, one joint at a time, finally removing both his hands. They eventually disemboweled him, making him a martyr to the Eastern Orthodox faith.  The Spanish captors were about to torture the next Aleut when orders were received to release the other Russian and Native Alaskan prisoners.

Historicity
An account of the martyrdom of Peter the Aleut is contained in a lengthy letter written on November 22, 1865, by Semyon Yanovsky to Damascene, abbot of the Valaam Monastery in Finland. Yanovsky (1789–1876), who is also one of the chief sources of information about St. Herman of Alaska, was chief manager of the Russian colonies from 1818 to 1820. In the letter he was reporting on an incident that he had heard from a supposed eyewitness, and that had taken place fifty years earlier in 1815.  The letter contains the description of Peter being tortured by "Jesuits" but this would have been virtually impossible, as the Jesuit order had been expelled from all Spanish territories in 1767, suppressed generally in 1773, and had only been reconstituted in 1814 (one year before Peter's alleged death). In 1815 there were no Jesuits within several thousand miles of California, as the reconstitution of the Jesuits in New Spain (that is, Mexico) would not take place until 1816. There were only Franciscans in California at the time, and it would be highly unlikely that anyone could confuse members of the two well-known and very dissimilar orders. Yanovsky adds, "At the time I reported all this to the Head Office in St. Petersburg." And indeed, this earlier communication, his official dispatch to the company's main office—dated Feb. 15, 1820, five years after the event—also relates the story of St. Peter's martyrdom, albeit with different details.

The most significant difference is that Yanovsky's original brief letter of 1820 accompanied a Russian translation of an account given in 1819 by a Kodiak Islander with the Russian name "Ivan Kiglay".  This is the only account that purports to be from a witness, and any differences found in other accounts (including in those of Yanovsky himself) are additions or embroideries that lack foundation or support.  Kiglay's account describes the capture of Russian-led fur poachers by Spanish soldiers in the vicinity of San Pedro Bay (the modern Port of Los Angeles) and taken to "the mission in Saint-Pedro".  (As there was no mission or settlement at San Pedro, it is unclear where the party was supposed to have been taken; the nearest mission would have been San Gabriel, although the non-mission village of Los Angeles would have been closer.)  While the rest of the prisoners are removed to Mission Santa Barbara, Kiglay and another Kodiak Islander named Chukagnak—who had been wounded in a battle with the soldiers—are imprisoned separately at "the mission at Saint-Pedro", and the next day Indians acting at the behest of a Spaniard torture and kill Chukagnak.  Kiglay is apparently going to receive the same treatment, until the Spaniard receives a letter that apparently gives other directions.  Kiglay is reimprisoned, and eventually escapes to Fort Ross, where he gives his testimony. There is nothing in the account that links the execution of Chucagnak to a refusal on his part to abandon Orthodoxy.  Instead, the eyewitness account states that the Kodiak islanders were all previously offered the opportunity to become Catholics, that they had all declined because they were already Christians, and then with the exceptions of Kiglay and Chukagnak were all transferred to Santa Barbara with no further mention of, or demand for, conversion.

Location of martyrdom and "San Pedro"
Peter the Aleut has been referred to as a "martyr of San Francisco". Additionally, many modern descriptions of the martyrdom of Peter the Aleut often describe the event as occurring "in San Francisco", and others describe the Native Alaskan traders as being brought "to San Francisco". Other sources can be found describing the event as occurring near Los Angeles or in Southern California. These varying descriptions of the location may be based on varying oral traditions, varying understandings of the relationship of the location of the martyrdom and Fort Ross, and also on varying interpretations of references to "San Pedro" in the original historical documents.

The earliest historical sources about the death of Peter the Aleut describe the event as taking place in or near "the mission of San Pedro". Some have taken this to refer to San Pedro y San Pablo Asistencia, a "sub-mission" of Mission San Francisco de Asís (also known as Mission Dolores). San Pedro y San Pablo Asistencia was located on the site of the modern-day Sánchez Adobe Park in modern-day Pacifica, California.

Others have interpreted the historical description to refer to the dock in San Pedro, Los Angeles (now located in modern-day Los Angeles), which was used at the time as a trading post by Spanish missionary friars from Mission San Gabriel Arcángel. Such an interpretation of "San Pedro" fits well with other references to geographical locations in the historical documents, including an island named Santa Rosa (interpreted to refer to Santa Rosa Island) an island named "Climant" (interpreted to refer to San Clemente Island) and an island named Ekaterina, (interpreted by some to refer to Catalina Island). These documents also describe the captured Native Alaskan traders as transferred to Fort Ross, by way of sequential stops in Santa Barbara and Monterey. This interpretation of a Southern Californian location for the martyrdom is further supported by a letter contemporaneous to the alleged martyrdom event from Franciscan Fr. José Francisco de Paula Señan dated June 19, 1816 (but which runs counter to allegations of forced conversion and violence against the Native hunters from Russian America), which describes the capture and transfer of "Russian Indians" to the Santa Barbara Presidio from Mission San Buenaventura (in modern-day Ventura, California).

Veneration
 According to Yanovsky's 1865 letter, upon receiving the report of Peter's death, St. Herman on Kodiak Island was moved to cry out, "Holy new-martyr Peter, pray to God for us!" Peter the Aleut was glorified as a saint by the Russian Orthodox Church Outside Russia and locally glorified by the Diocese of Alaska of the Orthodox Church in America as the "Martyr of San Francisco" in 1980.  His feast day is celebrated on September 24 or December 12. A number of churches have been dedicated to him in North America, including churches at Lake Havasu City, Arizona, Minot, North Dakota, Calgary, and Abita Springs, Louisiana.

Notes

Sources
  (Google Play Books link)
Farris, Glenn, "The Strange Tale of Saint Peter, the Aleut: A Russian Orthodox Martyr on the California Frontier". A paper presented at "The Spanish Missions and California Indians Symposium," D-Q University, 3 March 1990.
Ogden, Adele, The California Sea Otter Trade 1784-1848. (University of California Publications in History, 26). (Berkeley: University of California Press, 1941).
The Russian Orthodox Religious Mission in America, 1794–1837, with Materials Concerning the Life and Works of the Monk German, and Ethnographic Notes by the Hieromonk Gedeon. Originally published in St. Petersburg, Russia in 1894. Translated from the Russian by Colin Bearne; ed. by Richard A. Pierce (Kingston, Ont., Canada: Limestone Press, 1978).
Tarakanoff, Vassili Petrovitch, Statement of My Captivity Among the Californians (Los Angeles: Glen Dawson Press, 1953).
Tikhmenev, P. A, A History of the Russian-American Company.  Translated and edited by Richard Pierce and Alton Donnelly. (Seattle: Univ. of Washington Press, 1978).

External links
 Full text of Yanofsky's account of the martyrdom of Peter (Orthodox Church in America website)
 Namee, Matthew. "Is the St. Peter the Aleut story true?", OrthodoxHistory.org, January 31, 2011

18th-century births
1815 deaths
19th-century Christian saints
19th-century Eastern Orthodox martyrs
19th-century executions of American people
Alaska Native people
American saints of the Eastern Orthodox Church
American people of Aleut descent
American people of Russian descent
American Orthodox child saints
Christians from Alaska
Eastern Orthodoxy in Alaska
Eastern Orthodoxy in California
Executed people from Alaska
People executed by dismemberment
People executed by New Spain
People from Kodiak Island Borough, Alaska
People of Russian America
Russian saints of the Eastern Orthodox Church
Religious leaders from California
Religious leaders from Alaska